Przemysław Czerwiński (born 28 July 1983) is a Polish pole vaulter.

Czerwiński was born in Piła. He finished 5th in the pole vault final at the 2006 European Athletics Championships in Gothenburg.

Competition record

Personal bests
Outdoor
Pole vault – 5.80 m (Zhukovskiy 2006)

Indoor
Pole vault – 5.82 m (Donetsk 2010)

External links

1983 births
Living people
Polish male pole vaulters
Olympic athletes of Poland
Athletes (track and field) at the 2008 Summer Olympics
People from Piła
European Athletics Championships medalists
Sportspeople from Greater Poland Voivodeship
21st-century Polish people